Kamouraska-Témiscouata is a former provincial electoral district in Quebec, Canada that elected members to the National Assembly of Quebec. As of its final election, it included the municipalities of Kamouraska, La Pocatière, Saint-Athanase, Packington, Dégelis and Témiscouata-sur-le-Lac.

It was created for the 1973 election from Kamouraska and parts of L'Islet and Témiscouata.  Its final election was in 2008.  It was dissolved prior to the 2012 election and replaced by the Rivière-du-Loup–Témiscouata and Côte-du-Sud electoral districts.

Members of the National Assembly

Electoral results

References

External links
Information
 Elections Quebec

Election results
 Election results (National Assembly)
 Election results (Elections Quebec)

Maps
 2001 map (Flash)
2001–2011 changes (Flash)
1992–2001 changes (Flash)
 Electoral map of Bas-Saint-Laurent region (as of 2001)
 Quebec electoral map, 2001

Former provincial electoral districts of Quebec